Kenzer & Company (KenzerCo) is a Waukegan, Illinois based publisher of comic books, role-playing games, board games, card games, and miniature games.

They are known for the Kingdoms of Kalamar campaign setting and for their own HackMaster and Aces & Eights: Shattered Frontier role-playing games (RPGs). Perhaps their best known product is the Knights of the Dinner Table (KoDT) magazine, which is a monthly publication that is part comic book and part RPG magazine. KenzerCo's line of comics now includes spinoffs such as Knights of the Dinner Table Illustrated and Spacehack, licensed comics in the Dungeons & Dragons line, and the fantasy literature magazine Black Gate. Other products include the Fairy Meat miniatures game, the Fuzzy Knights web strips, the Monty Python and the Holy Grail card game and board games such as Dwarven Dig, Elemental, and The Great Space Race.

Notable employees
 Barbara Blackburn - Assistant Editor of KoDT and staff writer
 Jolly Blackburn - Vice-President and creator of Knights of the Dinner Table
 Brian Jelke - Vice-President and game designer
 Steve Johansson - Vice-President and game designer
 David Kenzer - President and game designer
 Jennifer Kenzer - CFO
 Mark Plemmons - Game designer, senior editor, art director, convention manager, HackMaster Association manager

Unlicensed supplements and trademark issues

In 1994, Kenzer & Company released The Kingdoms of Kalamar, a fantasy campaign setting compatible with Advanced Dungeons & Dragons.  This source book was a completely unlicensed product, and although TSR (the then-owner of the Dungeons & Dragons trademark) had a precedent of threatening legal action against similar supplements, Kenzer & Company was never threatened.

With the launch of Dungeons & Dragons’s 3rd edition, Wizards of the Coast made the d20 System available under the Open Game License (OGL) and d20 Trademark License. Under these licenses, authors are free to use the d20 System when writing games and game supplements.  Shortly after Wizards of the Coast announced the 3rd edition of Dungeons & Dragons, they announced jointly with Kenzer & Company that Kenzer had acquired a license to produce official Dungeons & Dragons material, using the Kalamar setting exclusively.

With the release of the fourth edition, Wizards of the Coast introduced its Game System License, which represented a significant restriction compared with the very open policies embodied by the OGL. In response, Kenzer & Company launched an updated version of Kingdoms of Kalamar compatible with the 4th-edition version of Dungeons & Dragons that did not conform to the new GSL for approved use, instead releasing the campaign setting as an unlicensed supplement, similar to the original publication.  The Dungeons & Dragons trademark is used in accordance with US law under a concept called nominative use – the book merely says that it is for use with the new version. David Kenzer is named as an expert in copyright law.

References

External links

Board game publishing companies
Card game publishing companies
Companies based in Lake County, Illinois
Game manufacturers
Role-playing game publishing companies
Waukegan, Illinois